Forficula scudderi is a species of earwig in the family Forficulidae.

References 

Forficulidae